Podocarpus sprucei is a species of conifer in the family Podocarpaceae. It is found largely in Ecuador and Peru.

Description
Tree to 20 m high (smaller at the highest elevations), with reddish brown scaly bark. Leaves elliptic to linear, dark green, stiff, 2–7 cm long, apex acute, midrib on upper side a continuous shallow groove. Male cones in groups of 3–10 on 1.5-2.5 cm long peduncles, each cone up to 1 cm long. Seed cones axillary, solitary, purple-red when ripe; seed globose, 5–8 mm long.

Distribution and habitat
Podocarpus sprucei can be found in cloud forests at 1800–3900 m of elevation in Ecuador and northern Peru.

References

sprucei
Trees of Ecuador
Trees of Peru
Taxonomy articles created by Polbot